Brendan James Galvin is an American poet. His book, Habitat: New and Selected Poems 1965–2005, was a finalist for the 2005 National Book Award.

Life
During forty years of college teaching, he served as Wyndham Robertson Visiting Writer in Residence in the MA program at Hollins University, Coal Royalty Distinguished Writer in Residence in the MFA program at the University of Alabama, Tuscaloosa, and Whichard chair in the Humanities at East Carolina University.

He lives with his wife, Ellen, in Truro, Massachusetts.
His translation of Sophocles’ Women of Trachis appeared in the Penn Greek Drama Series in 1998.

Awards
His narrative poem Hotel Malabar, winner of the 1997 Iowa Poetry Prize (University of Iowa Press, 1998).  His awards include a Guggenheim Fellowship, two NEA fellowships, the Sotheby Prize of the Arvon Foundation (England), and Poetry’s Levinson Prize, the OB Hardison Jr. Poetry Prize from the Folger Shakespeare Library, and the Charity Randall Citation from the International Poetry Forum.

Works

Books
 Ocean Effects, Louisiana State University Press, 2007
 The Strength of a Named Thing, Louisiana State University Press
 Sky and Island Light, Louisiana State University Press

Reviews
Galvin is a poet who has published much but not too much; that is, many of the poems here are as fresh and powerful as the poems in such strong earlier collections as Atlantic Flyway, Seals in the Inner Harbor, and Winter Oysters.  While Galvin continues to work the same material, he manages to make it new.

References

External links
 On the Poetry of Brendan Galvin: Habitat, New & Selected Poems (LSU Press), On the Seawall, Ron Slate
 "Interview", Thomas Reiter Shenandoah

Hollins University faculty
University of Alabama faculty
East Carolina University faculty
American male poets
Year of birth missing (living people)
Living people
Central Connecticut State University faculty